The Naval pentathlon is  a multisport which is practiced only by military athletes at the World Military Championships and Military World Games, both events organized by the international federation that governs military sport, the Conseil International du Sport Militaire.

The five races
Amphibious cross-country race
Life saving swimming race
Obstacle race
Seamanship race
Utility swimming race

See also
 International Military Sports Council
 Aeronautical pentathlon
 Military pentathlon
 Military World Games

References

External links
Naval pentathlon from site of the CISM

Military sports
Multisports
Pentathlon